In Sri Lankan architecture a pila is a type of veranda that was used for sitting, resting or working on that is most notably found in the homes of Sinhalese farm houses. The floor or platform is projected beyond the walls creating a continuous narrow ledge on the exterior of the building. Sri Lankan houses and other buildings that featured a courtyard could also have an inner pila.

The pila was built up from stone and earth brick which was smoothly plastered and finished with cow dung, creating a hygienic, hard and impervious surface. The houses of higher status people would have an increased number of rooms connecting the internal pila.

During the 19th and early 20th centuries visitors to houses with a pila would be received and entertained there. For people of lower status kolombu ketes, low wooden seats, would occasionally be brought out for their use.  In later times, due to Hindu influence, visitors of the same status as the owners, as dictated by caste, were invited into the courtyard of the house but were rarely invited to sleep there. However, in cases of emergency those visitors might stay in a front room.

See also
 Engawa

References

Citations

Bibliography

Architecture in Sri Lanka